An astronomical catalogue is a list or tabulation of astronomical objects, typically grouped together because they share a common type, morphology, origin, means of detection, or method of discovery. Astronomical catalogs are usually the result of an astronomical survey of some kind.

0–9
 0ES — Einstein Slew Survey, version 0
 1A, 2A, 3A — Lists of X-ray sources from the Ariel V satellite
 1C — First Cambridge Catalogue of Radio Sources
 1ES — Einstein Slew Survey
 1FGL, 2FGL — Lists of gamma-ray sources from the Large Area Telescope on board the Fermi Gamma-ray Space Telescope
 1RXH — ROSAT HRI Pointed Observations
 1RXS — ROSAT All-Sky Bright Source Catalogue, ROSAT All-Sky Survey Faint Source Catalog
 1SWASP — SuperWASP
 2A — see 1A
 2C — Second Cambridge Catalogue of Radio Sources
 2E — The Einstein Observatory Soft X-ray Source List
 2MASS — Two Micron All Sky Survey
 2MASP — Two Micron All Sky Survey, Prototype
 2MASSI — Two Micron All Sky Survey, Incremental release
 2MASSW — Two Micron All Sky Survey, Working database
 2MUCD — Ultracool Dwarfs from the 2MASS Catalog
 2MASX — Two Micron All Sky Survey, Extended source catalogue
 2MASS-GC (Globular Clusters, I.R.) (2MASS-GC 01 and 2MASS-GC 02 are Hurt 1 and Hurt 2) (source: Bruno Alessi)
 3A — see 1A
 3C (and 3CR) — Third Cambridge Catalogue of Radio Sources (and revised)
 4C — Fourth Cambridge Survey of celestial radio sources
 5C — Fifth Cambridge Survey of Radio Sources
 6C — Sixth Cambridge Survey of radio sources
 7C — Seventh Cambridge Survey
 8C — Eighth Cambridge Survey
 8pc — 8 parsec listing, all stars within 8 parsec
 9C — Ninth Cambridge survey at 15GHz

A
 AB - Azzopardi / Breysacher (Wolf-Rayet stars in the Small Magellanic Cloud, SMC)
 Abel (globular star clusters)
 Abell — Abell catalogue
 Abetti - Giorgio Abetti (double stars)
 Abt - (for example: open star cluster Abt 1 = Biurakan 4 = Markarian 6)
 AC — Astrographic Catalogue
 A.C. - Alvan Clark (double stars)
 Ac / Ack - Agnès Acker (planetary nebulae)
 A.G.C. - Alvan Graham Clark (double stars)
 AGC - Arecibo General Catalog 
 ADS — Aitken Double Star Catalogue
 AFGL - Air Force Geophysical Laboratory
 Ag - Aguero (catalogue of peculiar galaxies, captured during the Palomar Sky Survey)
 AG, AGK, AGKR — Astronomische Gesellschaft Katalog
 AH03 - (star clusters) (source: Bruno Alessi's list)
 Al - Allen (planetary nebulae)
 Alden - H.L. Alden (double stars)
 Alessi - Bruno Sampaio Alessi's catalogue of telescopic asterisms and open star clusters
 Alessi / Teutsch - Bruno S. Alessi's and Philipp Teutsch's catalogue of telescopic asterisms and open star clusters
 Ali - H. Ali (double stars)
 Alicante (for example: open star cluster Alicante 1 at 3:59:18 / +57°14'14")
 Aller - R.M. Aller (double stars)
 ALS — UBV beta database for Case-Hamburg Northern and Southern Luminous Stars
 Alter (open star clusters)
 Alves / Yun (open star clusters)
 AM - Arp-Madore catalogue of open and globular star clusters (Halton Arp / Barry F. Madore) (for example: Arp-Madore 1 in Horologium, Arp-Madore 2 in Puppis)
 An - Anderson (double stars)
 Andrews / Lindsay (AL) (open star clusters)
 Annis (?)
 APM — Automatic Plate Measuring machine
 Apriamashvili (open star clusters)
 Ara - (for example: Ara 2035 at 7:08.8/-24°03' Canis Major) (see Sky Catalogue 2000.0, Volume 2, page 48) (S.Aravamudan?)
 Arak / Ark - Marat Arsen Arakelian, 1929-1983 (Arakelian Emission Line Objects)
 Arce / Goodman (open star clusters)
 Archinal - probably Brent A. Archinal (for example: open star cluster Archinal 1 at 18:54:49 / +5°32'54")
 Arg - F.W.A. Argelander (double stars)
 ARO - Algonquin Radio Observatory
 Arp — Atlas of Peculiar Galaxies
 ASCC — N.V. Kharchenko, All-Sky Compiled Catalogue, Kinematika Fiz. Nebesn. Tel., 17, part no 5, 409 (2001)
 Auner - (for example: open star cluster Auner 1 at 7:04:16 / -19°45'00" in Canis Major) (Auner 1 is the cluster which was "lost" in the disturbing ghost reflection of nearby Alpha Canis Majoris, aka Sirius, this during the Palomar Observatory Sky Survey, POSS)
 Av - Antalova (open star clusters)
 Av-Hunter - Aveni / Hunter (open star clusters)
 AXP - Anomalous X-Ray Pulsar
 AZ / AzV - Azzopardi-Vigneau

B
 β - S. W. Burnham (double stars)
 βpm - Burnham's measures of proper motion stars, 1913 catalogue.
 B - Willem H. van den Bos (double stars)
 B — E. E. Barnard's List of Dark Nebulae
 Ba - Barnard (double stars)
 Ba - Baade (planetary nebulae)
 BAC — Bordeaux Astrographic Catalog
 Bail / Bal - R. Baillaud (double stars)
 Baize / Baz - Paul Baize (Paul Achille-Ariel Baize, 1901-1995) (double stars)
 Balbinot (open and globular star clusters) (for example: globular star cluster Balbinot 1 in Pegasus)
 Bar - Barkhatova (open star clusters) (for example: Barkhatova 1, NNW of NGC 7000; the North America Nebula in Cygnus)
 BAR - E.E.Barton (double stars)
 Bas - Basel (open star clusters)
 Bat - Hans Battermann, 1860-1922 (double stars)
 BAT99 - The Fourth Catalogue of Population I Wolf Rayet stars in the Large Magellanic Cloud
 BAY — Uranometria (Bayer designation)
 BCVS — Bibliographic Catalogue of Variable Stars
 BD — Bonner Durchmusterung
 BDS — Burnham Double Star Catalogue
 BDS03 (I.R.) - (open star clusters)
 BDSB - (for example: open star cluster BDSB 96 at 7:05:18 / -12°19'44")
 BDSB03 (I.R.) - (open star clusters)
 Be - Bergvall (catalogue of some 400 interacting and distorted galaxies found on glass copies of the ESO Blue Survey) (source: A Catalogue of Southern Peculiar Galaxies and Associations, Volume 1 - H.C.Arp / B.F.Madore)
 Be — Berkeley (open star clusters) (104 items)
 Be - Bernes
 Bedin - Luigi Bedin (for example: dwarf spheroidal galaxy Bedin I in Pavo)
 Ben — Jack Bennett's catalogue of 152 deep-sky objects in the southern celestial hemisphere, all from the NGC or IC lists, except Ben 47 which is Melotte 105 in Carina, and Ben 72a which is Trumpler 23 in Norma
 Bergeron - Joe Bergeron (for example: Bergeron 1 in Cepheus, Sky & Telescope 12/'04, Page 86)
 BFS - Blitz-Fitch-Stark (for example: BFS 15 in Cepheus, Sky & Telescope 12/'04, page 87)
 BH - Van den Bergh / Hagen (open star clusters), see also VdB-Ha
 Bhas/Bha - T.P.Bhaskavan (double stars)
 Bi - Biurakan (open star clusters)
 Bica - (open star clusters)
 Bica / Schmitt (open star clusters)
 Big - Guillaume Bigourdan (double stars)
 Bird - F.Bird (double stars)
 Bl - Victor Manuel Blanco (for example: open star cluster Blanco 1 in Sculptor)
 Bloch/Blo - M. Bloch (double stars)
 Bo - Bochum (open star clusters)
 Bo - Bond (double stars)
 BoBn - Boeshaar-Bond (planetary nebulae)
 Bode - (telescopic asterisms)
 Boe - Boeger (double stars)
 Bogleiv (open star clusters)
 Bonatto (open star clusters)
 Boo - Samuel Latimer Boothroyd, 1874-1965 (double stars)
 Boy - Bowyer (double stars)
 BPI - (open star clusters)
 BPM / L — Bruce Proper Motion Survey (Luyten)
 BPMA - Bordeaux Catalogue (double stars)
 Bradley
 Brandt - (for example: open star cluster Brandt 1 at 8:09:32 / -47°20'12") ( = Pozzo 1) (very near Gamma Velorum, also known as 'Regor')
 Brand / Wouterloot (BW) (open star clusters)
 Brey - Breysacher, Large Magellanic Cloud Wolf Rayet stars
 BRI — Bj, R, I survey
 Briceno (open star clusters)
 Brosch - (open star clusters)
 Brso/Bso - Brisbane Observatory, Australia (double stars)
 Brt - S.G.Barton (double stars)
 Btz - E.Bernewitz (double stars)
 Bry - Walter William Bryant (double stars)
 BV - Bohm-Vitense (planetary nebulae)
 BVD - R.Benavides (double stars)

C
 C — Caldwell catalogue (Sir Patrick Moore)
 Caballero-Solano - (for example: open star cluster Caballero-Solano 1 at Delta Orionis, also known as the Mintaka cluster)
 Calvet - (telescopic asterisms)
 Camargo - (open star clusters)
 Canali - (telescopic asterisms)
 Capo/Cpo - Cape Observatory, South Africa (double stars)
 CARMA
 Carpenter - (for example: Carpenter 1 at galactic coordinates 213.34 / -12.60) (= BDB 229, = FSR 1086, = MWSC 732)
 Carraro - (for example: open star cluster Carraro 1 at 10:37:00 / -58°44'00") (NW of the Eta Carinae Nebula)
 CBB - (open star clusters)
 CCCP-Cl - (open star clusters)
 CCCP-Gp - (open star clusters)
 CCCS - Catalogue of Cool Carbon Stars
 CCDM — Catalog of Components of Double and Multiple Stars
 CCO — Catalogue of Cometary Orbits
 CCS — General Catalogue of Cool Carbon Stars
 CCS2 — General Catalog of S Stars, second edition
 CD / CoD — Cordoba Durchmusterung
 CDIMP — Catalogue of Discoveries and Identifications of Minor Planets
 CED - Cederblad (gaseous nebula)
 CEL — Celescope Catalogue of Ultraviolet Magnitudes
 Cezar - (for example: Cezar 6 at galactic coordinates 204.93 / -13.83)
 CFBDSIR - Canada-France Brown Dwarf Survey (IR = Infra Red?)
 CG - Cometary Globule (for example: CG 4 in Puppis, also known as 'God's Hand')
 CGCG - Catalogue of Galaxies and Clusters of Galaxies
 CGCS - Catalogue of Galactic Cool Carbon Stars
 CGO — Catalogue of Galactic O Stars
 CGSS — Catalogue of Galactic S Stars
 Chaple - (for example: Chaple 1 at galactic coordinates 74.46 / +3.66, which is an asterism called Chaple's Arc, and also Cygnus Fairy Ring, and HD 190466 Group, and Ramakers 20)
 Chatard - (telescopic asterisms)
 Che - P. S. Chevalier (double stars)
 Chereul - (moving groups of stars)
 Chiravalle - (for example: Chiravalle 1 at galactic coordinates 75.25 / +27.91, which is an asterism called Candle and Holder).
 Chupina - (Chupina objects 1 to 5 are located at and near open star cluster Messier 67 in Cancer)
 CIO — Catalog of Infrared Observations
 CLUST - (open star clusters)
 CMC — Carlsberg Meridian Catalogue
 Cn - Cannon (planetary nebulae) (Cn1 / Cn2 / Cn3)
 Cog - Cogshall (double stars)
 Col - Collins (double stars)
 Com - G. C. Comstock (double stars)
 Cop - Copeland (double stars)
 Coro/Coo - Cordoba Observatory, Argentina (double stars)
 CoRoT — CoRoT Catalogue
 CoRoT-Exo — CoRoT Catalogue
 Cou - Paul Couteau (double stars)
 CP - Cambridge Pulsar
 CPC — Cape Photographic Catalogue
 CPD — Cape Photographic Durchmusterung
 Cr - Collinder (open star clusters) (Per Collinder)
 Crinklaw - (telescopic asterisms)
 CRL - Cambridge Research Laboratory Sky-Survey
 Cruls/Cru - L. Cruls (double stars)
 CSI — Catalog of Stellar Identifications
 CSV — Catalog of Suspected Variables
 CSS — General Catalogue of S Stars
 Cz - Czernik (open star clusters)

D
 D — James Dunlop (A catalogue of nebulae and clusters of stars in the southern hemisphere, observed at Parramatta in New South Wales)
 DA — Dominion Observatory List A
 Danjon - Andre Danjon (double stars)
 Danks - (open star clusters)
 Dawes - W.R.Dawes (double stars)
 δ - B.H.Dawson (double stars)
 DBSB03, I.R. - (open star clusters)
 DB2000 (Dutra-Bica 2000, I.R.) (open star clusters)
 DB2001 (Dutra-Bica 2001, I.R.) (open star clusters)
 DC - (open star clusters)
 DCld — A catalogue of southern dark clouds
 DDO - David Dunlap Observatory (Dwarf Galaxies)
 DeHt - Dengel-Hartl (planetary nebulae)
 Dem - Ercole Dembowski (double stars)
 DENIS — Deep Near Infrared Survey of the Southern Sky
 DENIS-P — Deep Near Infrared Survey, Provisory designation
 Desvoivres - (telescopic asterisms)
 DHW - Dengel-Hartl-Weinberger (planetary nebulae)
 Dias - Wilton S. Dias, UNIFEI (open star clusters)
 Dick - J.Dick (double stars)
 Djorg - Stanislav George Djorgovski (globular star clusters) (for example: Djorgovski 1 in Scorpius)
 Dju - P.Djurkovic (double stars)
 DM — Durchmusterung
 BD — Bonner Durchmusterung
 CD / CoD — Cordoba Durchmusterung
 CPD — Cape Photographic Durchmusterung
 DN - Duus-Newell (Catalogue of Southern Groups and Clusters of Galaxies) (Alan Duus / Barry Newell)
 DnB - Open Source (nebulae)
 DO — Dearborn Observatory
 Do - Dolidze (open star clusters) (57 items)
 Dob - A.W.Doberck (double stars)
 Dom - Jean Dommanget (double stars)
 Don - H.F.Donner (double stars)
 Donatiello - Giuseppe Donatiello (for example: dwarf spheroidal galaxy Donatiello I in Andromeda)
 Doo - Eric Doolittle (double stars)
 DoDz - Dolidze-Dzimselejsvili (open star clusters) (11 items)
 Dorpat - Dorpat Observatory, Estonia
 DR - Downes and Rinehart microwave sources
 Du - Duner (double stars)
 Δ - James Dunlop (double stars)
 Dutra-Bica (open star clusters)
 DWB - Dickel, Wendker, Bieritz (A catalogue of optically visible HII regions in the Cygnus X region)
 Dwingeloo - Dwingeloo Obscured Galaxy Survey (DOGS) (for example: Dwingeloo 1 and Dwingeloo 2 in Cassiopeia)

E
 E - (for example: globular star cluster E 3 at 9:20:59 / -77°16'57", in Chamaeleon) (source: Bruno Alessi's and Wilton Dias's lists)
 EC — Edinburgh-Cape Blue Object Survey
 Edg - D.W.Edgecomb (double stars)
 [EG97] - Eckart + Genzel, 1997 (Stars close to Sagittarius A*, like [EG97]S2.) 
 Egb - Egbert (double stars)
 EGB - Ellis-Grayson-Bond (planetary nebulae)
 Eggen - Olin J. Eggen (double stars)
 EGGR — Eggen-Greenstein proper motion star
 Elosser - (telescopic asterisms)
 EMP — Ephemerides of Minor Planets
 Eng - Engelmann (double stars)
 EPIC - Ecliptic Plane Input Catalog
 Escorial - (open star clusters)
 ESO — European Southern Observatory Catalog
 Esp - T. E. H. Espin (double stars)
 Es/Birm - Espin/Birmingham (catalogue of red stars)

F
 F - Fath - Edward Arthur Fath, 1880-1959 (for example: galaxy Fath 703, aka NGC 5892, in Libra)
 Fa - Fairall (Anthony Patrick Fairall, 1943-2008)
 FCC — Fornax Cluster Catalogue
 Fei - Feinstein (open star clusters)
 Feibelman (for example: open star cluster Feibelman 1 near 'The Revenante of the Swan' 34-P Cygni)
 Feigelson (for example: open star cluster Feigelson 1 at 11:59:51 / -78:12:27)
 Ferrero (telescopic asterisms)
 Φ - W.S.Finsen (double stars)
 Fg - Fleming (planetary nebulae), for example: Fleming 1
 FK4 — Fourth Fundamental Catalogue
 FK5 — Fifth Fundamental Catalogue
 Fle - J.O.Fleckenstein (double stars)
 FLM — Historia coelestis Britannica (Flamsteed designation)
 For - L.Forgeron (double stars)
 Fox - Philip Fox (double stars)
 French - Sue French (from Sky and Telescope)
 Fr - Frolov (open star clusters)
 Franz - J.Franz (double stars)
 Frh - R.Furuhjelm (double stars)
 Frk - W.S.Franks (double stars and colours of stars) (probably William Sadler Franks, published a catalogue of the colours of 3890 stars)
 FSC — Faint Source Catalogue
 FSR - Froebrich-Scholz-Raftery, I.R. (open and globular star clusters) (for example: globular star cluster FSR 1758 in Scorpius)
 Fur - H.Furner (double stars)

G
 G — Lowell Proper Motion Survey (Giclas)
 GD — Lowell Proper Motion Survey (Giclas dwarf)
 GR* — Lowell Proper Motion Survey (Giclas red star)
 HG — Lowell Proper Motion Survey (Giclas Hyades)
 Gale - W.F.Gale (double stars)
 Gallo - J.Gallo (double stars)
 GAn - G.Anderson (double stars)
 Gaia catalogues (general purpose)
 Gaia DR1
 Gaia DR2
 Gaia EDR3
 Gaia DR3
 GC — General Catalogue of Nebulae and Clusters
 GC (Boss) — Boss general catalogue of 33342 stars
 GCRV — General Catalogue of Stellar Radial Velocities
 GCTP — General Catalogue of Trigonometric Parallaxes
 GCVS — General Catalog of Variable Stars
 Giclas - Henry L. Giclas (double stars)
 Gl / GJ — Gliese–Jahreiß catalogue or Gliese–Jahreiß catalogue
 GJJC - Gillett-Jacoby-Joyce-Cohen (planetary nebulae)
 Gli - J.M.Gilliss (double stars)
 GLIMPSE - (together with Mercer in the list of 10978 star clusters)
 Glp - S. de Glasenapp (double stars)
 GM - Gyulbudaghian-Maghakian (planetary nebulae)
 Gol - H.Goldschmidt (double stars)
 GOS — Galactic O Star Catalogue
 GOSSS — Galactic O-Star Spectroscopic Survey
 Goyal - A.N.Goyal (double stars)
 Graham (for example: open star cluster Graham 1 at 10:56:32 / -63:01:04)
 Gr - Grant (double stars)
 Grasdalen (open star clusters)
 GR - Gibson Reaves (for example: Gibson Reaves 8 (GR 8) (galaxy) in Virgo) (Gibson Reaves, 1923-2005)
 GRB - Gamma Ray Burst
 Grindlay (globular star clusters) (for example: Grindlay 1 in Scorpius, at 17:32.0 / -33°50') (source: The Deep Sky Field Guide To Uranometria 2000.0, Cragin-Lucyk-Rappaport) (and also Sky Catalogue 2000.0, Volume 2)
 GRO - Gamma Ray Observatory (NASA - Compton)
 Groombridge (Stephen Groombridge, 1755-1832)
 GSC — Guide Star Catalog
 GSC2 / GSC II — Guide Star Catalog II
 GSPC — Guide Star Photometric Catalog
 GSPC2 — Guide Star Photometric Catalog, 2nd
 Gsh - J.Glaisher (double stars)
 GΣ - G.Struve (double stars)
 Gtb - K.Gottlieb (double stars)
 Gui - J.Guillaume (double stars)
 Gum - Gum catalog of emission nebulae

H
 h - John Herschel (double stars)
 H - Haro (planetary nebulae)
 H - Harvard (open star clusters)
 H - William Herschel (double stars)
 HA - ? (for example: galaxy HA 85 in Telescopium, see chart 26 in Wil Tirion's Sky-Atlas 2000.0) (however, chart 435 in Uranometria 2000.0, Volume 2, 1987 edition, shows this object as ESO 183-G30)
 Haf - Haffner (open star clusters)
 Hall - Asaph Hall (double stars)
 HAT - Hungarian Automated Telescope (search for extrasolar planets)
 HaTr - Hartl-Tritton (planetary nebulae)
 Haufen - (for example: Haufen A in Cetus, at 1h 08.9m / -15° 25' (2000.0), which is, according to Sky Catalogue 2000.0, Volume 2, the same as Abell 151)
 Hav/Moffat - Havlen-Moffat (open star clusters)
 Hb - Hubble (planetary nebulae)
 HC - Howell-Crisp (planetary nebulae)
 HCG — Hickson Compact Group
 HCWils - H.C.Wilson (double stars)
 HD - Henry Draper Catalogue
 HDE — Henry Draper Extension
 HDEC — Henry Draper Extension Charts
 HdO - Harvard Observatory USA, and stations elsewhere (double stars)
 HDW - Hartl-Dengel-Weinberger (planetary nebulae)
 Hdz - Harvard Zone Catalogues (double stars)
 HE — Hamburg/ESO Survey
 He - Henize (planetary nebulae)
 Hen — Henize Catalogues of Hα-Emission Stars and Nebulae in the Magellanic Clouds
 Hf - Hoffleit (planetary nebulae)
 HFG - Heckathorn-Fesen-Gull
 HH - Herbig-Haro object
 HIC — Hipparcos Input Catalogue
 HIP — Hipparcos Catalogue
 HIPASS — HI Parkes All-Sky Survey
 Hld - E.S.Holden (double stars)
 Hlm - E.Holmes (double stars)
 Hln - Frank Holden (double stars)
 HN - William Herschel's 1821 catalogue (double stars)
 Ho - Hogg (open star clusters)
 Ho - G.W.Hough (double stars)
 Holmberg - Erik Holmberg (dwarf irregular galaxies)
 Hooke - Robert Hooke (double stars)
 Howe - H.A.Howe (double stars)
 HP - Haute Provence (globular star clusters) (for example: HP 1 in Ophiuchus, at 17:31.1 / -29°59') (source: The Deep Sky Field Guide To Uranometria 2000.0, Cragin-Lucyk-Rappaport) (and also Sky Catalogue 2000.0, Volume 2)
 HR — Bright Star Catalogue (Harvard Revised Catalogue)
 Hrg - L.Hargrave (double stars)
 Hrr - Harrington (telescopic asterisms)
 HΣ - Hermann Struve (double stars)
 HS - Hamburg Survey (quasars and blue stars)
 HSC - Hubble Source Catalog (lists of sources from the Hubble Space Telescope)
 Hst - C.S.Hastings (double stars)
 Hu - Humason (planetary nebulae)
 Hu - W.J.Hussey (double stars)
 Hurt - Robert Hurt (for example: globular star cluster Hurt 2, aka 2MASS-GC02 in Sagittarius)
 Huygens - Christiaan Huygens (double stars)
 HV - Harvard Variable
 HVGC - Hyper Velocity Globular Cluster (for example: HVGC-1 in the supergiant elliptical galaxy Messier 87 in Virgo)
 HVS - HyperVelocity Stars
 Hynek - J. Allen Hynek (double stars)
 Hz - Wulff D. Heintz (double stars)
 Hzg - E.Hertzsprung (double stars)

I
 I - Robert Thorburn Ayton Innes (R.T.A.Innes, 1861-1933) (double stars)
 IC — Index Catalogue
 IC I — Index Catalogue I
 IC II — Index Catalogue II
 IDS — Index Catalogue of Visual Double Stars
 IGR — Integral Gamma-Ray source
 IPHAS — The INT Photometric Hα Survey of the Northern Galactic Plane
 IRAS — Infrared Astronomical Satellite
 IRS — International Reference Star
 Isk - Iskudarian (open star clusters)
 Isserstedt (telescopic asterisms)
 IsWe - Ishida-Weinberger (planetary nebulae)
 Ivanov (open star clusters)

J
 J — Robert Jonckheere's catalogue of double star observations (see  for an article about it)
 Ja - Jacoby (planetary nebulae)
 JaFu - Jacoby-Fullton (planetary nebulae)
 JAn - John A. Anderson (double stars)
 Jc - William Stephen Jacob (double stars)
 Jef - H.M.Jeffers (double stars)
 Jn - Jones (planetary nebulae)
 JnEr - Jones-Emberson (planetary nebulae)
 Jo - Jones (double stars)
 Johansson - (open star clusters) (for example: Johansson 1 at 15:46:20 / -52:22:54)
 Joy - Alfred Harrison Joy (double stars)
 Jsp - Morris Ketchum Jessup (double stars)
 Juchert - (open star clusters)
 Juchert-Saloranta (telescopic asterisms)
 JW — Jones' & Walker's list of stars near the Orion Nebula.

K
 K - Lubos Kohoutek (planetary nebulae)
 Ka - Valentina Karachentseva (dwarf galaxies)
 Karhula - (for example: open star cluster Karhula 1 near planetary nebula Messier 76 in Perseus)
  - K2 (Kepler extended mission) catalog
 KELT - Kilodegree Extremely Little Telescope (search for extrasolar planets)
 Kemble - Father Lucian Kemble (asterisms which could be observed through binoculars)
 Kepler — Kepler catalog
 Kes - Kesteven (supernova remnants). For example: Kesteven 79
 K / Kg - Ivan R. King (open star clusters)
 KGZ — Catalogue de Zimmerman
 Kharchenko (for example: open star cluster Kharchenko 1 at 6:08:48 / +24:19:54)
 KIC — Kepler Input Catalog
 Kim - Dongwon Kim (for example: globular star cluster Kim 2 in Indus)
 KjPn - Kazaryan-Parsamyan (planetary nebulae)
 Klemola (for example: Klemola 44 galaxy cluster in Sculptor) (? - Arnold Richard Klemola, 1931-2019)
 KnFs - Kinman-Feast-Lasker (planetary nebulae)
 Knott / Kn - G.Knott (double stars)
 KOI — Kepler Object of Interest
 Kontizas (for example: Kontizas 953 in Dorado) (in the Large Magellanic Cloud)
 Koposov (open and globular star clusters) (for example: globular star clusters Koposov 1 and Koposov 2 in Virgo and Gemini)
 Kr - A.Kruger (double stars) (probably Karl Nikolaus Adalbert Krueger, 1832-1896)
 Kron - (globular star clusters) (for example: Kron 3 in Tucana)
 Kronberger - (for example: open star cluster Kronberger 1 in Auriga)
 Kru - E.C.Kruger (double stars)
 Ku - F.Kustner (double stars)
 KUG - Kiso Survey for Ultraviolet-excess Galaxies
 Kui - Gerard P. Kuiper, 1905-73 (double stars)
 KUV — Kiso observatory, UV-excess object

L
 L / BPM — Bruce Proper Motion Survey (Luyten)
 La - Langley (double stars)
 Lac - N. de Lacaille, 1713-62 (double stars)
 Lac — Catalog of Nebulae of the Southern Sky (Lacaille)
 Lac I — Nebulae
 Lac II — Nebulous Star Clusters
 Lac III — Nebulous Stars
 Laevens - Benjamin P. M. Laevens (globular clusters and dwarf galaxies), for example: Laevens 1 in Crater, Laevens 2 in Triangulum (Triangulum II), Laevens 3 in Delphinus.
 Lal - F. de Lalande (double stars)
 Lam - J. von Lamont (double stars)
 λ (Lambda) - (mentioned in T.W.Webb's Celestial Objects for Common Telescopes, Volume 2: The Stars, pages 285-319: Index of Double Stars, Epoch 2000)
Printed examples from the 'Lambda' catalogue: λ 32 (RA 3:47.9), λ 88 (RA 7:48.9), λ 91 (RA 7:55.7), λ 96 (RA 8:12.5), λ 108 (RA 9:0.3), λ 115 (RA 9:37.1), λ 140 (RA 11:56.7), λ 176 (RA 13:20.5), λ 228 (RA 15:23.2), λ 249 (RA 15:47.6), λ 316 (RA 17:0.4), λ ? (RA 17:6.4), λ 320 (RA 17:12.2), λ 342 (RA 17:53.3). All examples are located in the southern celestial hemisphere. The 'Lambda' catalogue is related to T.J.J.See's catalogue of double stars.
 LAMOST - Large Sky Area Multi-Object Fibre Spectroscopic Telescope (Guo Shoujing Telescope)
 Latham - (for example: Latham 1 at 13:10:50 / +30:28:36)
 Latysev - (open star clusters)
 Lau - H.E.Lau (double stars)
 LBN — Lynds' Catalogue of Bright Nebulae
 Lbz - P.Labitzke (double stars)
 LDN — Lynds' Catalogue of Dark Nebulae
 LDS — Luyten Double Star catalogue
 LEDA — Lyon-Meudon Extragalactic Database
 Lederman - (telescopic asterisms)
 Le Gentil - (for example: Le Gentil 3 in Cygnus, at 21:08 / +51°40') (dark nebula)
 Leon - Frederick C. Leonard (double stars)
 Lewis - Thomas Lewis (double stars)
 LFT — Luyten Five-Tenths catalogue
 LG11 — Lépine & Gaidos 2011, bright M dwarfs
 LGG - Lyons Groups of Galaxies
 LGS - (for example: dwarf galaxy LGS 3 in Pisces, also known as the Pisces Dwarf)
 LHA - Lamont-Hussey Alpha
 LHS — Luyten Half-Second catalogue
 Liller (globular star clusters) (for example: Liller 1 in Scorpius)
 Lo - Lars Olof Loden (open star clusters)
 Lo - Longmore
 Loiano - (for example: Loiano 1 at 19:58:21 / +32:32:42)
 Lorenzin - (telescopic asterisms)
 LoTr - Longmore-Tritton (planetary nebulae)
 LP — Luyten-Palomar Survey
 LPM — Luyten Proper-Motion Catalogue
 LPO - La Plata Observatory, Argentina
 LS — either of two "Luminous Stars" catalogues; see LSN and LSS, below
 LS - Lensed Star (LS 1 = 'Icarus' in Leo) (see MACS J1149 Lensed Star 1)
 LSA - Lundstrom-Stenholm-Acker (planetary nebulae)
 LSN — Luminous Stars in the Northern Milky Way
 LSPM — LSPM catalog - Lépine-Shara Proper Motion catalog
 LSR — Lepine-Shara-Rich catalogue
 LSS — Luminous Stars in the Southern Milky Way
 LTT — Luyten Two-Tenths catalogue
 Luginbuhl-Skiff - (for example: Luginbuhl-Skiff 1 at 6:14:48 / +12:52:24)
 Luhman - (for example: Luhman 16 in Vela)
 Luy - W.J.Luyten (double stars)
 Lv - Francis Preserved Leavenworth (double stars)
 Ly - Lynga (open star clusters)

M
 M — Catalog of Nebulae and Star Clusters (Messier object)
 M - Minkowski (planetary nebulae)
 Ma - J.H.Madler (double stars)
 Mac - Maclear (double stars)
 MACS - Massive Cluster Survey or Magellanic Catalogue of Stars
 MACHO — MACHO Project lensing events (Massive Compact Halo Object)
 MACHO-LMC — MACHO Project Large Magellanic Cloud Microlensing
 MACHO-SML — MACHO Project Small Magellanic Cloud Microlensing
 Maffei - Paolo Maffei (for example: galaxies Maffei 1 and Maffei 2 in Cassiopeia)
 Mailyan - (for example: Mailyan 44, aka Holmberg I / DDO 63 / UGC 5139, at 9h 40.5m / +71° 11' in Ursa Major)
 Malin - David Malin (for example: the largest galaxy known; Malin 1 in Coma Berenices)
 Mamajek (open star clusters) (for example: Mamajek 1 at 8:42:06 / -79:01:38)
 Markov (telescopic asterisms) (for example: Markov 1 in Hercules)
 MAXI — Monitor of All-sky X-ray Image
 Mayall - Nicholas Mayall (for example: globular star cluster Mayall II orbiting Messier 31, the Andromeda galaxy)
 Mayer (open star clusters)
 McC — McCormick Observatory Catalog
 MCG — Morphological Catalogue of Galaxies
 MCW — Morgan, Code, and Whitford
 Me - Merrill (planetary nebulae)
 Mel - Melotte Catalogue of open star clusters (Philibert Jacques Melotte)
 Mercer (for example: globular star cluster Mercer 3 in Scutum)
 MGC (globular star clusters) (for example: MGC1 in Pisces)
 Mh - O.M.Mitchel (double stars)
 Mil - J.A.Miller (double stars)
 Miller (open star clusters) (for example: Miller 1 at 9:25:42 / -53:14:00)
 Milb - W.Milburn (double stars)
 MlbO - Melbourne Observatory, Australia (double stars)
 Mlf - Frank Muller (double stars)
 Mlr - Paul Muller (double stars)
 Moffat (open star clusters) (for example: Moffat 1 at 16:01:30 / -54:07:00)
 Moitinho (open star clusters) (for example: Moitinho 1 at 8:19:17 / -45:12:30)
 MPC — Minor Planet Circulars contain astrometric observations, orbits and ephemerides of both minor planets and comets
 Mrk - Benjamin "Benik" Egishevitch Markarian (open star clusters)
 MSH — Mills, Slee, Hill - Catalog of Radio Sources
 Muzzio (open star clusters) (for example: Muzzio 1 at 8:57:12 / -47:46:00)
 MW — Mandel-Wilson Catalogue of Unexplored Nebulae, not in SIMBAD yet
 MWP - Motch-Werner-Pakull (planetary nebulae)
 MyCn - Mayall-Cannon (planetary nebulae)
 Mz - Menzel (planetary nebulae)

N
 N - (for example: N 164 nebula in Dorado)
 Na - Nassau (planetary nebulae)
 Naillon - (telescopic asterisms) (source: Bruno Alessi's list)
 N30 — Catalog of 5,268 Standard Stars Based on the Normal System N30
 Neckerman (telescopic asterisms) (for example: Neckerman 1, aka Kemble 2 "Little Cassiopeia").
 NED - NASA/IPAC Extragalactic Database
 Negueruela - (Ignacio Negueruela)
 NeVe - Neckel-Vehrenberg (planetary nebulae)
 New - ? (galaxies)
 New 1 in Cetus (source: The Deep-Sky Field Guide to Uranometria 2000.0, Cragin-Lucyk-Rappaport, chart 262).
 New 5 in Sagittarius (thus mentioned on chart 22 of Wil Tirion's Sky-Atlas 2000.0, mentioned as ESO 285-G7 on charts 411 and 412 in Uranometria 2000.0 Volume 2, 1987 edition).
 New 6 in Indus (chart 23 in Tirion's Sky-Atlas 2000.0, chart 413 in the 1987 edition of Uranometria 2000.0, Volume 2) (as ESO 287-G13)
 NGC — New General Catalogue
 NGTS - Next-Generation Transit Survey (extrasolar planets)
 NHICAT — Northern HIPASS Catalog
 NLTT — New Luyten Two-Tenths Catalogue
 NOMAD — The Naval Observatory Merged Astrometric Dataset (NOMAD) 
 NStars — Nearby Stars Database
 NSV — New Catalogue of Suspected Variable Stars
 NZO - New Zealand Observatory (double stars)

O
 O - O'Neal (open star clusters)
 OEC — Open Exoplanet Catalogue 
 OGLE — Optical Gravitational Lensing Experiment
 Ol - Charles Pollard Olivier (double stars)
 Opik - Ernst J. Opik (double stars)
 OSC — Open Supernova Catalog 
 OΣ - Otto Struve, Pulkovo Catalogue, 1843 (double stars)
 OΣΣ - Otto Struve, Pulkovo Catalogue Supplement, 1843 (double stars)
 OSS — Ohio Sky Survey
 OTC — Open TDE Catalog 
 OTS - Oasa-Tamura-Sugitani
 Ou - Nicolas Outters (for example: Ou 4, the 'Squid Nebula' in Cepheus) (see APOD - Astronomy Picture Of the Day - July 18, 2014).

P
 P - Perrine (double stars)
 PAL — Palomar Globular Clusters (15 globular clusters discovered on the Palomar Observatory Sky Survey plates)
 Par - Parkhurst (double stars)
 PB - Peimbert-Batiz (planetary nebulae)
 PC - Peimbert-Costero (planetary nebulae)
 Pe - Perek (planetary nebulae)
 Perr - Perrotin (double stars)
 Perry - Perry (double stars)
 PG - Palomar-Green (catalogue of ultraviolet excess stellar objects)
 PGC — Principal Galaxies Catalogue
 PH - Planet Hunters
 PHL — Palomar-Haro-Luyten catalogue
 Pi - Pismis (Paris Pişmiş, 1911-1999) (catalogue of 22 open star clusters and 2 globular star clusters)
 PK — Catalogue of galactic planetary nebulae (Perek-Kohoutek)
 PKS - Parkes Catalogue of Radio Sources
 Platais - Imants Platais' catalogue of open star clusters
 Plq - Paloque (double stars)
 PLX — General Catalogue of Trigonometric Stellar Parallaxes and Supplement (Jenkins, Yale University)
 PM - Preite Martinez (planetary nebulae)
 PMC — Tokyo Photoelectric Meridian Circle Catalog
 PN — See PNG
 PNG — Strasbourg-ESO Catalogue of Galactic Planetary Nebulae
 Pol - Pollock (double stars)
 Pou - Pourteau (double stars)
 PPM — Positions and Proper Motions Star Catalogues
 Pri - Pritchett (double stars)
 PrO - Perth Observatory, Australia (double stars)
 Prz - Przbyllok (double stars)
 Ps - Francis G. Pease (planetary nebulae) (for example: Pease 1 in the globular cluster Messier 15, Pegasus)
 PSR - Pulsating Source of Radio (pulsars)
 PTFO — Palomar Transient Factory
 Ptt - Pettit (double stars)
 Pu - Purgathofer (planetary nebulae)
 PuWe - Purgathofer-Weinberger (planetary nebulae)
 Pz - Piazzi (double stars)

Q
 Q (?) - (for example: galaxy Q 6188 at 0:48.6 / -12:44 in Cetus) (mentioned on charts 261 / 262 in Uranometria 2000.0 Volume 2, 1987 edition) (according to Wolfgang Steinicke and Richard Jakiel of the book Galaxies and How to Observe Them, this galaxy (Q 6188) is also catalogued as Mrk 960 and PGC 2845)
 QES - QATAR Exoplanet Survey
 QSO — Revised and Updated Catalog of Quasi-stellar Objects
 QZM - (for example: QZM 2 at galactic coordinates 78.12 / +3.63) (J2000 - 20:14:26 / +41°13'28") (QZM 2 = Froebrich 116, = SUH 151)

R
 R - Radcliffe Observatory (RMC - Radcliffe Observatory Magellanic Clouds Catalogue)
 R - Rose (Rose Catalogue of Southern Clusters of Galaxies)
 R - H.C.Russell (double stars)
 Raab (open star clusters)
 RAFGL - Revised Air Force Geophysical Laboratory (four color infrared sky survey)
 Raymond - (telescopic asterisms)
 RBC - Revised Bologna Catalogue (for example: globular cluster RBC EXT8 in Messier 31; the Andromeda galaxy)
 RC — Reference Catalogue
 RC2 — Reference Catalogue, 2nd edition
 RC3 — Reference Catalogue, 3rd edition
 RCW — Rodgers-Campbell-Whiteoak A catalogue of Hα-emission regions in the southern Milky Way
 RECONS — Research Consortium on Nearby Stars
 Reiland - (for example: open star cluster Reiland 1 at 23:04:45 / +60°04'40")
 Reinmuth - (galaxies) (for example: Reinmuth 80 in Virgo) (NGC 4517A)
 Renou (telescopic asterisms)
 Reyle-Robin - (open star clusters, I.R.)
 Richaud - Jean Richaud, 1633-93 (double stars)
 Riddle - (open star clusters / telescopic asterisms)
 Rmk - C.L.C.Rumker (double stars)
 RMM - (for example: open star cluster RMM 1 at 12:12:20 / -63°15'31")
 RNGC — Revised New General Catalogue
 Ro - Curt Roslund (open star clusters)
 Roberts - (protoplanetary nebulae)
 Roe - Edward Drake Roe, 1859-1929 (double stars)
 Roman-Lopes - (open star clusters, I.R.)
 Ross — Ross Catalogue of New Proper Motion Stars
 ROT — Catalogue of Rotational Velocities of the Stars
 RSA — Revised Shapley-Ames Catalogue
 RSGC - Red Super Giant Cluster (for example: RSGC 3 at 18:45:20 / -3°24'43")
 RST — Catalogue of southern double stars (Richard Alfred Rossiter, 1886-1977)
 Ru - Jaroslav Ruprecht (open star clusters)
 RX — ROSAT observations

S
 S - James South, 1785-1867 (double stars)
 Sa - Sanduleak (planetary nebulae)
 SA - Sandqvist (dark nebulae) (for example: Sandqvist 169 near Alpha Centauri, see APOD - Astronomy Picture Of the Day, April 13, 2019)
 SACS — Second Astrolabe Catalogue of Santiago
 Saloranta - Jaakko Saloranta (telescopic asterisms)
 SAO — Smithsonian Astrophysical Observatory Star Catalog
 Saurer - (for example: the open star cluster Saurer 1 at 7:18:18 / +1°53'12")
 SaWe - Sanduleak-Weinberger (planetary nebulae)
 SAX - Satellite per Astronomia a raggi X (Beppo SAX satellite)
 SC — Slough catalogue ("Observations of Nebulae and Clusters of Stars, made at Slough, with a Twenty-Feet Reflector, between the years 1825 and 1833" by John Herschel; 2306 entries)
 Schb - J.M.Schaeberle (double stars)
 Schj - H.C.F.C.Schjellerup (double stars)
 Schoenberg - (for example: Schoenberg 205-6 at 6:37.1 / +10°21')
 Schuster - (for example: open star cluster Schuster 1 at 10:04:39 / -55:51:29)
 SCM — Schwarz, Corradi, Melnick catalogue.
 Scott - J.L.Scott (double stars)
 SCR — SuperCOSMOS-RECONS
 SDSS — Sloan Digital Sky Survey
 SDSSp — Sloan Digital Sky Survey, provisory
 1SDSS — Sloan Digital Sky Survey, 1st release
 2SDSS — reserved by the Sloan Digital Sky Survey for future release.  The name is reserved to the IAU, but does not exist yet.
 3SDSS — reserved by the Sloan Digital Sky Survey for future release.  The name is reserved to the IAU, but does not exist yet.
 Se - Father Angelo Secchi (double stars)
 Se - Sersic (selected list of peculiar galaxies and groups of galaxies)
 See - T.J.J.See (Thomas Jefferson Jackson See, 1866-1962) (double stars) (related to the 'Lambda' catalogue which is mentioned in T.W.Webb's Celestial Objects for Common Telescopes, Volume 2: The Stars, pages 285-319: Index of Double Stars, Epoch 2000).
 SEGUE - Sloan Extension for Galactic Understanding and Exploration (for example: galaxies Segue 1 in Leo, Segue 2 in Aries, and Segue 3 in Pegasus)
 Sei - J.Scheiner (double stars)
 SGR - Soft Gamma Repeater
 Sh — Sharpless catalog (Sh 1 (1953) & Sh 2(1959))
 Sh - Sher (open star clusters) (for example: Sher 1 at 11:01:04 / -60:14:00)
 S, h - James South / John Herschel (joint 1824 catalogue of double stars)
 Shk - Romela Karapet Shakhbazian (compact groups of galaxies) (for example: Shakhbazian 1 (the 'Russian Cluster') in Ursa Major, at 10:54.8 / +40°28')
 Shorlin - (for example: open star cluster Shorlin 1 at 11:05:46 / -61:13:48)
 Simeis - (for example: supernova remnant Simeis 147 / Sh2-240 in Taurus, also known as the 'Spaghetti Nebula')
 SIMP — Sondage Infrarouge de Mouvement Propre
 Sinnott - (multiple star systems)
 SIPS — Southern Infrared Proper Motion Survey
 Sk - Skinner (double stars)
 SL - Sandqvist-Lindroos (dark nebulae)
 Slr - R.P.Sellors (double stars)
 Smart - W.M.Smart (double stars)
 Smyth - W.H.Smyth (1788-1865) (double stars)
 Sn - Shane (planetary nebulae)
 Sp - G.V.Schiaparelli (double stars)
 Sp - Shapley (planetary nebulae)
 Spano - (telescopic asterisms)
 SPF2 — Second Cat of Fundamental Stars
 SPF3 — Third Santiago-Pulkovo Fundamental Star Catalogue
 SPOCS — Spectroscopic Properties of Cool Stars
 SRS — Southern Reference Star Catalog
 SS - Sadler and Sharp (survey of E-type and S0-type galaxies)
 SS - Sanduleak-Stephenson (for example: SS 433 in Aquila)
 SSSPM — SuperCOSMOS Sky Survey
 SSTc2d — Spitzer Space Telescope c2d Legacy Source
 SSTDUSTG — DUSTiNGS (Dust in Nearby Galaxies with Spitzer)
 St - Carl L. Stearns (double stars)
 Ste - Stephenson (open star clusters)
 Stein - Johan Stein (double stars)
 Steine - (open star clusters)
 STF (Σ) — Struve the Father double stars
 ΣI - W.Struve, First Supplement (double stars)
 ΣII - W.Struve, Second Supplement (double stars)
 St / Stock — Stock open clusters (Stock 1 and 2 in, Stock 3 to 23 in, Stock 24 in )
 Stone - Ormond Stone (double stars)
 Streicher - (telescopic asterisms)
 Stromlo - (for example: Stromlo 2 in Monoceros and Canis Major, at IC 2177; the 'Eagle Nebula')
 StWr - Stock-Wroblewski (planetary nebulae)
 Sw - Swift (double stars)
 SWEEPS - Sagittarius Window Eclipsing Extrasolar Planet Search
 Swift (for example: Swift J1745-26 in Sagittarius) (stellar-mass black hole)
 SwSt - Swings-Struve (planetary nebulae)
 SyO - Sydney Observatory, Australia (double stars)

T
 Ta — Tarrant (double stars)
 TAC — Twin Astrograph Catalog
 Tc — Thackeray (planetary nebulae)
 TD1 — Catalogue of stellar UV fluxes (TD1 satellite)
 Terzan — Agop Terzan Catalogue of Globular Star Clusters (11 objects)
 THA — TH-alpha catalogue of emission line stars in the Eta Carinae nebula region
 TIC — TESS Input Catalog
 TIC — Tycho Input Catalog
 TOI — TESS Object of Interest
 Tom — Tombaugh (open star clusters)
 Ton — Tonantzintla Catalogue (globular star clusters)
 TPK — Teutsch-Patchick-Kronberger (asterisms)
 TRAPPIST — Transiting Planets and Planetesimals Small Telescope
 TrES — Trans-Atlantic Exoplanet Survey
 TrES-And0 — TrES of planetary candidate in the Andromeda constellation
 TVLM — Tinney's Very Low Mass Catalogue
 TYC — Tycho Catalogue
 TYC2 — Tycho-2 Catalogue
 Tr / Trumpler — Robert Julius Trumpler's open cluster list, published in Preliminary results on the distances, dimensions and space distribution of open star clusters
 Tu — Tucker (double stars)

U 
 UBV — Photoelectric Catalogue, magnitude and color of stars in UBV (Blanco et al. 1968)
 UBV M — UBV Photoelectric Photometry Catalogue (Mermilliod 1987)
 UCAC — USNO CCD Astrograph Catalog (UCAC1, UCAC2, UCAC3, UCAC4 & UCAC5)
 UGC — Uppsala General Catalogue (galaxies)
 UGCA - Uppsala Selected non-UGC Galaxies
 UKS - United Kingdom Schmidt (globular star clusters)
 ULAS - UKIDDS Large Area Survey (quasars)
 Up - Upgren (open star clusters) (only one object in this catalogue? Upgren 1) (probably Arthur R. Upgren, 1933-2017)
 Up - Upton (double stars)
 USNO — US Naval Observatory
 USNO-A1.0— US Naval Observatory, A1.0 catalogue
 USNO-A2.0 — US Naval Observatory, A2.0 catalogue
 USNO-B1.0 — US Naval Observatory, B1.0 catalogue
 uvby98 — uvbyβ photoelectric photometric catalogue, by B. Hauck, M. Mermilliod, Astron. Astrophys., Suppl. Ser., 129, 431-433 (1998)

V
 vB — Van Biesbroeck's star catalog, variant, "VB"
 VBRC (?)
 VCC — Virgo Cluster Catalog
 Vd - Vandervort (planetary nebulae)
 VdB — Van den Bergh (catalogue of reflection nebulae)
 VdB-H - Van den Bergh-Herbst (open star clusters)
 VdB-Ha - Van den Bergh-Hagen (open star clusters)
 VFTS - VLT Flames Tarantula Survey
 Vou - J.G.E.G. Voute (double stars)
 VPHAS+ The VST Photometric Hα Survey of the Southern Galactic Plane and Bulge
 VV  — Vorontsov-Vel'yaminov Interacting Galaxies (Boris Aleksandrovich Vorontsov-Vel'yaminov)¨
 VVV Survey — Vista Variables in the Via Lactea (Latin for Milky Way)
 VVV-CL - (open star clusters, I.R.)
 Vy - Vyssotsky (planetary nebulae) (Alexander Vyssotsky)

W
 W - Radiosource (Westerhout)
 W20 — Washington 20 Catalog
 Wa / Ward  - I.W.Ward (double stars)
 Wa - Waterloo (open star clusters)
 WASP — Wide Angle Search for Planets
 WASP0-TR — Wide Angle Search for Planets, Transit
 WDS — Washington Double Star Catalog
 We - Weinberger (planetary nebulae) (Ronald Weinberger)
 We - Westerlund (open star clusters) (Bengt Westerlund, 1921-2008)
 Webb - T.W.Webb (double stars)
 WeDe - Weinberger-Dengle (planetary nebulae)
 Weisse - M.Weisse (double stars)
 WeSa - Weinberger-Sabbadin (planetary nebulae)
 Wg - R.W.Wrigley (double stars)
 Whiting - Alan B. Whiting (globular star clusters) (for example: Whiting 1 at 2h 02m / -3° 15' in Cetus)
 WhMe - Whitelock-Menzies
 Willman - Beth Willman (for example: ultra low-luminosity dwarf galaxy or star cluster Willman 1 in Ursa Major)
 Wils - R.H.Wilson, jr. (double stars)
 Win - Winlock (double stars)
 Wirtz - Carl Wirtz (double stars)
 WISE — Wide-field Infrared Survey Explorer
 WISEA — AllWISE Source Catalog
 WISEP — Wide-field Infrared Survey Explorer Preliminary Release Source Catalog
 WNC / Winn — Winnecke Catalogue of Double Stars
 WNO - Washington Observations (double stars) (U.S. Naval Observatory, Washington D.C.)
 Wo — Woolley Nearby Star Catalogue
 Wolf — Catalogue of High Proper Motion Stars (Wolf)
 Worley - Charles E. Worley (double stars)
 WR — Catalog of Galactic Wolf-Rayet stars (Charles Wolf / Georges Rayet)

X
 XBS — XMM-Newton, Bright Source
 XBSS — XMM-Newton Bright Serendipitous Survey
 XEST — XMM-Newton Extended Survey of the Taurus Molecular
 XEST-OM — XEST, Optical/UV Monitor
 XO - XO-Project (XO Telescope) (search for extrasolar planets)
 XTE — X-ray Timing Explorer
 XZ - XZ Catalogue of Zodiacal Stars (Richard Schmidt / Tom Van Flandern, 1977, U.S. Naval Observatory)

Y
 Y - Young (double stars)
 YBS - Yale Bright Star Catalogue
 YZ — Yale Observatory Zone Catalog

Z
Z — Fritz Zwicky, Catalogue of galaxies and of clusters of galaxies
 ZC - Robertson's Zodiacal Catalogue (James Robertson's catalogue of 3539 zodiacal stars brighter than 9th magnitude)
Zij — Islamic astronomical books that tabulates parameters used for astronomical calculations of the positions of the Sun, Moon, stars, and planets
Book of Fixed Stars
Tables of Toledo
Zij-i Ilkhani
Zij-i-Sultani

See also
Lists of astronomical objects
List of astronomical objects named after people
List of astronomy acronyms
List of common astronomy symbols
Glossary of astronomy
Modern constellations

Notes and references

External links
VizieR
CDS Service for Astronomical Catalogues
Dictionary of Nomenclature of Celestial Objects

Astronomical catalogues